Hungama is 2005 Indian Telugu-language comedy film directed by S. V. Krishna Reddy starring  Ali, Abhinayasri, Venu Madhav and Brahmanandam. The film is a remake of the Malayalam film Mattupetti Machan (1998). Hungama was successful at the box office.

Plot
Pedda Babu and Chinna Babu are step brothers and also neighbors each with a beautiful daughter. Balaraju gets insulted when he visits the house of Chinna Babu for a marriage proposal. Balaraju wants to seek revenge by making sure that Vidya Jyothi – daughter of Chinna Babu – would get the worst youngster as husband.

After research, Balaraju closes on Balu who is an herb selling fraudster. Due to certain misunderstanding, he enters the house of Peda Babu and tries seducing his daughter, Divya. Bala Raju finds another worthless youngster called Badri who is a pimp by profession. Both Balu and Badri claim themselves as sons of billionaire Jamindar to impress Chinna Babu and Pedda Babu. Balu and Badri make Divya and Vidya fall in love with them respectively. The film ends with how the characters' lives end well.

Cast

 Ali as Badri
 Venu Madhav as Balu
 Kota Srinivasa Rao as Pedda Babu
 Tanikella Bharani as Chinna Babu
 Brahmanandam
 Narsing Yadav
 M. S. Narayana
 Rajendra Babu
 Ramaraju
 Dharmavarapu Subramanyam
 Sunil as Balaraju
 Gundu Hanumantha Rao
 Raghu Babu
 Jyothi
 Abhinayashree as Divya
 Amukta Malyada
 Jayalalitha
 Sobharani
 Sobhana
 Vimala Sri

Soundtrack

Reception 
Sify wrote " S.V.Krishna Reddy is back with yet another comedy that fails to impress. It is nothing but slapstick galore with mistaken identities and lot of double meaning dialogues." Idlebrain.com gave 2.75 stars out of 5 and opined that first half of the film is mediocre and get a little better in the latter half.

References

External links
 

2005 films
2000s Telugu-language films
Telugu remakes of Malayalam films
Indian romantic comedy films
Films directed by S. V. Krishna Reddy
Films scored by S. V. Krishna Reddy
2005 romantic comedy films